Vasuben Trivedi is a Member of Legislative assembly from Jamnagar constituency in Gujarat for its 12th legislative assembly. She was Minister of State Education, Women and Child Welfare (Independent Charge) in Anandiben Patel ministry.

References

Living people
People from Jamnagar
Bharatiya Janata Party politicians from Gujarat
Women in Gujarat politics
Gujarat MLAs 2002–2007
Gujarat MLAs 2007–2012
Gujarat MLAs 2012–2017
21st-century Indian women politicians
21st-century Indian politicians
Year of birth missing (living people)